In geometry, the pentagonal gyrobicupola is one of the Johnson solids. Like the pentagonal orthobicupola, it can be obtained by joining two pentagonal cupolae along their bases. The difference is that in this solid, the two halves are rotated 36 degrees with respect to one another.

The pentagonal gyrobicupola is the third in an infinite set of gyrobicupolae.

The pentagonal gyrobicupola is what you get when you take a rhombicosidodecahedron, chop out the middle parabidiminished rhombicosidodecahedron, and paste the two opposing cupolae back together.

Formulae
The following formulae for volume and surface area can be used if all faces are regular, with edge length a:

References

External links
 

Johnson solids